Billy Porter may refer to:

Billy Porter (actor) (born 1969), American actor, Broadway performer, singer
Billy Porter (criminal) (1850–?), American burglar and underworld figure in New York City
Billy Porter (Australian footballer) (1875–1910), Australian rules footballer
Billy Porter (footballer, born 1905) (1905–1946), English footballer
"Billy Porter", a song by Mick Ronson from Play Don't Worry

See also
Bill Porter (disambiguation)
William Porter (disambiguation)